Hungarian Civic Alliance (MPSZ, GSM) is political party in Serbia representing the Hungarian minority. It is led by László Rác Szabó.

Participation in elections

2008 elections
In 2008 local elections in Serbia, the Hungarian Civic Alliance won 12.97% of votes in Senta and two seats in the municipal parliament in Ada.

2012 elections
In the 2012 elections in Serbia, the party was part of the All Together coalition, which won 1 seat in the Serbian parliament, no seats in the provincial parliament of Vojvodina and no plurality of votes in any municipality in Vojvodina.

See also
All Together (Serbia)

Hungarian political parties in Serbia
Politics of Vojvodina
Regionalist parties
Hungarian nationalism